Great Pond may refer to:

Great pond (law), a legal term defining public waters in the United States

Place names
Great Pond, a pond in the Belgrade Lakes area of Maine
Great Pond, Maine, a town in Hancock County
Great Pond (Massachusetts), a pond in Truro, Massachusetts
Great Pond (New Hampshire), a lake in southern New Hampshire
Frensham Great Pond, a pond on Frensham Common, Surrey, UK